Nicholas David Banks (born 28 July 1965) is an English drummer, a member of the British band Pulp. He lives in Sheffield with his wife Sarah and two children. He is the nephew of Gordon Banks, goalkeeper of the 1966 FIFA World Cup-winning England squad.

Nick started playing drums aged 14 and was inspired by Paul Cook from the Sex Pistols and Blondie's Clem Burke.

In their early years he saw many of Pulp's performances in Sheffield. He eventually joined the group in 1986 because "they were [his] favourite band".

Banks also played drums in a Sheffield-based band called Pollinates.

Since 2007 he has been managing Banks Pottery, a family-owned business which was previously run by his mother. He plays regularly in Sheffield's Everly Pregnant Brothers and BigShambles and remains a member of Pulp.

References

English rock drummers
Musicians from Sheffield
Pulp (band) members
People from Rotherham
1965 births
Living people